Vikingsholm is a 38-room mansion on the shore of Emerald Bay at Lake Tahoe, in El Dorado County, California, U.S., and on the National Register of Historic Places. It has been called "one of the finest examples of Scandinavian architecture in North America."

History
Vikingsholm was built by Lora Josephine Knight as a summer home. The foundation was laid in 1928, and the building was constructed in 1929 by around 200 workers. Before starting construction, Knight and her architect traveled to Scandinavia to gather ideas for the house. Some parts of the structure contain no nails or spikes, as a result of old-fashioned construction methods. Most of the building was made from local materials.

While Mrs. Knight is known for building Vikingsholm, she and her businessman husband Harry were also primary backers of Charles Lindbergh's non-stop solo flight across the Atlantic Ocean in 1927.

Harvey West, a wealthy lumberman who owned the land after Knight, sold it to California for half of the appraised value in 1953.

Vikingsholm has been called "one of the finest examples of Scandinavian architecture in North America."

Emerald Bay State Park
Vikingsholm, along with Knight's "Tea House" on Fannette Island, is a part of Emerald Bay State Park, which has been declared a National Natural Landmark. Tours are given of the American Craftsman Vikingsholm museum home for a nominal fee.

References

External links

official Emerald Bay State Park – Vikingsholm website
vikingsholm.com: information
AboutLakeTahoe.com: More information about Emerald Bay, Vikingsholm, and Fannette Island, including link to a topographical map of the site
OpenRoad.TV – (video story about Vikingshold and Emerald Bay)

Lake Tahoe
Museums in El Dorado County, California
Historic house museums in California
Open-air museums in California
State parks of California
History of El Dorado County, California
History of the Sierra Nevada (United States)
Houses on the National Register of Historic Places in California
National Natural Landmarks in California
Houses completed in 1929
Houses in El Dorado County, California
American Craftsman architecture in California
National Register of Historic Places in El Dorado County, California